Picacho Reservoir is just  south of Coolidge in central Arizona. The reservoir was built in the 1920s as part of the San Carlos Irrigation Project. The reservoir's original purpose was water storage and flow regulation for the Florence-Casa Grande and Casa Grande Canals. Over the years, siltation and vegetation have reduced the capacity and surface area, so that much of the reservoir is a shallow marsh with extensive stands of cattails and rushes. Water level is highly variable, and the lake is completely dry in some years.

Fish species
 Largemouth Bass
 Crappie
 Sunfish
 Catfish (Channel)
 Tilapia
 Carp
 Bullfrogs

References

External links
Arizona Boating Locations Facilities Map
Arizona Fishing Locations Map
Video of Picacho Reservoir

Historic American Engineering Record in Arizona
Reservoirs in Pinal County, Arizona